The Western Province Open was a golf tournament in South Africa as part of the South African Tour.

Winners 
This list is incomplete

 1936 Alf Padgham (268)

 1956 Bobby Locke (287)
 1957 Gary Player (285)
 1958 Bobby Locke (286)
 1959 Harold Henning (280)
 1960 Gary Player (271)
 1961 Harold Henning (284)
 1962 Tommy Trevena
 1963 Bobby Verwey (286)
 1964 Retief Waltman
 1965 Allan Henning
 1966 Cobie Legrange
 1967 Denis Hutchinson
 1968 Gary Player (280)
 1969 Cobie Legrange (272)
 1970 Bobby Walker (284)
 1971 Gary Player
 1972 Gary Player
 1973 Hugh Baiocchi (292)
 1974 (Jan) John Fourie
 1974 (Nov) Bill Brask (280)
 1975 No tournament due to rescheduling from November to January
 1976 Allan Henning (282)

References

Golf tournaments in South Africa
Former Sunshine Tour events